Dairoidea is a superfamily of crabs, comprising two families which each contain a single genus: Dairidae (the living fossil Daira ) and Dacryopilumnidae (Dacryopilumnus) .

Species
Dairidae
Daira americana Stimpson, 1860
Daira coronata Beschin, De Angeli, Checchi & Zarantonello, 2005 †
Daira depressa (A. Milne-Edwards, 1865) †
Daira perlata (Herbst, 1790)
Daira salebrosa Beschin, Busulini, De Angeli & Tessier, 2002 †
Daira sicula (Di Salvo, 1933) †
Daira speciosa (Reuss, 1871) †
Daira vulgaris Portell & Collins, 2004 †
Dacryopilumnidae
Dacryopilumnus eremita Nobili, 1906
Dacryopilumnus rathbunae Balss, 1932

References

External links

Crabs
Extant Eocene first appearances
Arthropod superfamilies